The 2014 FFSA GT Championship season was the eighteenth season of the FFSA GT Championship, the grand tourer-style sports car racing founded by the French automobile club Fédération Française du Sport Automobile. The season started on 26 April at Le Mans and ended on 26 October at Le Castellet after seven double-header meetings.

The drivers' championship was won by IMSA Performance drivers Raymond Narac and Nicolas Armindo, finishing just two points of their nearest rivals, Henri Hassid and Mike Parisy. A further five points behind in third place were Saintéloc Racing's David Hallyday and Grégory Guilvert. Narac and Armindo won the most races during the season with three victories. Hassid, Parisy, Hallyday, Guilvert,  Philippe Giauque, Morgan Moullin-Traffort, Jean-Claude Police, Soheil Ayari, all scored two wins during the season.

Race calendar and results
All races were held in France and were part of the GT Tour weekends, while Spa round was held and supported FIA WTCC Race of Belgium.

Standings

Drivers' championship

References

External links
 
 FFSA GT on RacingSportCars

FFSA GT season